NPH may refer to:

Medicine
 NPH insulin, an intermediate-acting insulin
 National Pediatric Hospital, Cambodia, a government-run pediatric hospital in Phnom Penh
 Normal pressure hydrocephalus, a condition of excessive fluid in the brain

Other
 Fujicolor Pro (previously NPH 400), a line of professional color negative films
 National Party of Honduras, a centre-right conservative political party in Honduras
 Neil Patrick Harris, American actor, singer, director and magician
 Negative pH (band), an Electronic music band
 New Phyrexia (expansion code: NPH), a Magic: the Gathering expansion set
 North Providence High School, a public high school in North Providence, Rhode Island
 Northwestern Publishing House, the official publishing house for the Wisconsin Evangelical Lutheran Synod
 Nuestros Pequeños Hermanos, a charity in Latin America that runs orphanages
 Nyiakeng Puachue Hmong, a writing system used for the Hmong language